Lac des Estaris is a lake in Orcières, Hautes-Alpes, France.

Estaris